Suparma is an Indonesian pulp and paper company based in Surabaya, East Java. Suparma was founded in 1976 by Welly.

History 
Suparma was founded on 25 August 1976 by Welly in Surabaya. In April 1978, Suparma commercially turned into a limited company. The company operates in papermaking. Suparma produces various types of paper which can be classified into two major groups, namely industrial products and consumer products. Suparma products include layered duplex boards, non-layered duplex boards, written and printed paper, samson kraft paper, kraft packaging, striped kraft, bread laminating, newsprint, PE laminating kraft, manifold paper, MG paper, hand towels, tissue paper, and others.

In 1984 the company decided to roll out her first expansion program by adding three units of paper machine and raised its total production capacity to 51,000 ton per year.

In 1992, Suparma invested another two units of paper machine with capacity of 99,000 tons per year to accommodate the strong increase of paper demand in the market in tandem with the Indonesian government industrialization program.

Suparma sells domestic products and exports to Malaysia, Vietnam, Korea, Taiwan, the Philippines and other countries. Suparma was listed on the Surabaya Stock Exchange (now Indonesia Stock Exchange) in 1994.

Products 

 Laminated Wrapping Kraft
 Samson Kraft
 MG Paper
 Coated Duplex Board
 Sandwiched Ribbed Kraft Recycle
 Bathroom Tissue
 Facial Tissue
 Napkin Tissue
 Carrier Tissue
 Hand Towel
 Industrial Roll Towel
 Clinical Roll Towel
 Kitchen Towel

See also 

 List of paper mills
 List of companies of Indonesia

References

External links 
 Official Website of Suparma

Pulp and paper companies of Indonesia
Manufacturing companies established in 1976
Indonesian brands
Indonesian companies established in 1976
Companies based in Surabaya
Companies listed on the Indonesia Stock Exchange
1994 initial public offerings